Richard Griffith may refer to:

 Sir Richard Griffith, 1st Baronet (1784–1878), Irish geologist and surveyor
 Richard Griffith (general) (1814–1862), United States general
 Richard Griffith (chess player) (1872–1955), English chess player
 Richard Griffith (priest), 17th-century Irish Anglican priest
 Richard Griffith (politician) (1752–1820), Irish politician

See also
Richard Griffiths (disambiguation)